Xylomoia strix is a species of moth, belonging to the genus Xylomoia.

It is native to Eastern Europe.

References

Hadeninae